

Table

References
Footnotes

Citations

 1001
Discovered using the Kepler spacecraft, 1001
 1001